Mevo Modi'im (lit. Modi'im Gateway), officially Me'or Modi'im, is a moshav in central Israel. It is also known as the Carlebach Moshav. Located north-west of Modi'in on Highway 443, it falls under the jurisdiction of Hevel Modi'in Regional Council. In 2019, a fire destroyed most of Mevo Modi'im and it is currently in the process of reconstruction and expansion.

Establishment
The village was founded as a moshav shitufi in 1975 by Rabbi Shlomo Carlebach, who acquired it from Poalei Agudat Yisrael where he had family connections.  Rabbi Carlbach lived there in the later years of his life. Some of the residents came to the village as a group from Jerusalem, following the direction of Carlebach. Many came from or through the former "The House of Love and Prayer" which was first established in San Francisco, and later in Jerusalem. The group is a collection of eclectic individuals, including musicians, artists, organic farmers, wine makers, perfumers and specialists in many areas. Many excel in their field in all of Israel.

Description
At its centre, the village has a hand-painted and ornately decorated main synagogue, painted by Yitzchak Ben Yehudah.

Mevo Modi'im has a variety of eateries including Luciano’s, HaChatzer, and Falafel al HaDerech.

Moshav residents built a new pavilion near the antiquities site on the moshav in memory of Esh Kodesh Gilmore who was killed in a terrorist attack on 30 October 2000.

Fire and rebuilding
On May 23, 2019 a large fire destroyed most of Mevo Modi'im - forty out of fifty homes. A Fire Services investigation concluded it was started in multiple locations, raising suspicion of arson. A year after the fire most of the residents were still homeless. In 2020 the residents made a land settlement with authorities. Public contracts for the construction of 112 residential units were engaged in 2021.

See also
Carlebach minyan
Moshav Band
Kalonymus Kalman Shapira of Piasetzno

References

Community settlements
Religious Israeli communities
Populated places established in 1964
Populated places in Central District (Israel)
Shlomo Carlebach
1964 establishments in Israel